Muhammad Zamani Bin Md Zamri (born 31 May 2001) is a Singaporean footballer currently playing as a midfielder for Young Lions.

Club career 
Zamani started his football career with Albirex Niigata in 2019. He spent one season with Albirex Niigata and moved to Young Lions FC.

International career 
Zamani was called up to the Singapore U23 national squad for the 2022 AFF U-23 Championship held in Phnom Penh, Cambodia.

Career statistics

Club

Notes

References

2001 births
Living people
Singaporean footballers
Association football midfielders
Singapore Premier League players
Albirex Niigata Singapore FC players
Young Lions FC players
Singapore youth international footballers